Rustom Khurshedji Karanjia (15 September 1912 – 1 February 2008) was an Indian journalist and editor. He typically signed his reports as "R. K. Karanjia". He founded the Blitz, a weekly tabloid with focus on investigative journalism in 1941, and ran it for the next four decades. He also founded The Daily, a daily tabloid which was run by his daughter.

Early life and background
Karanjia was born to a Parsi family in Quetta, now in Balochistan in the Northern part of Pakistan.

Career
Karanjia began writing while still in college, and during the 1930s Karanjia was employed an assistant editor at The Times of India. He left The Times of India in 1941 to launch Blitz (newspaper), a weekly tabloid with a focus on investigative journalism. It was one of the few Indian newspapers to have carried out interviews with the high and mighty, including the likes of Fidel Castro and Zhou Enlai. The Daily and The Blitz were also incubators for the likes of R.K. Laxman, P. Sainath and Teesta Setalvad, all of whom started their journalistic careers there. Karanjia served as a war correspondent during the Japanese Burma offensive in World War II, reporting on the action in Burma and Assam. Blitz folded during the mid-1990s and Karanjia retired from public life.

Karanjia died at his home, a seafront flat along Marine Drive, in Mumbai at the age of 95 on 1 February 2008.  In a "departure from Parsi tradition, as per his wishes," his funeral was held in Chandanvadi crematorium, in south Mumbai. Karanjia was survived by one daughter, Rita Mehta, the founder and first Editor-in-chief of Cine Blitz magazine. His brother, Burjor, was also a journalist, albeit in the film industry, editor of Filmfare.

Owner editor of Blitz
Karanjia was founder and owner editor of Blitz, a tabloid weekly published from Mumbai. Kulkarni narrates that the decision to launch Blitz was taken over a cup of tea, by three patriotic journalists- B. V. Nadkarni, Benjamin Horniman and Karanjia- at Wayside Inn, a restaurant near Kala Ghoda, in Mumbai. The first issue of Blitz was published on 1 February 1941 (the same day that Karanjia died in 2008). Kulkarni calls his journalism "irreverent, investigative, courageous and a little titillating".  Khwaja Ahmad Abbas, writer and film maker, and P. Sainath, Magsaysay award winning journalist, were associated with Blitz. Blitz was radical and idealist, left  leaning and pro-Soviet. Karanjia attacked the Congress party, and yet was friendly with Congress leaders Nehru, Indira Gandhi and Rajiv Gandhi. Karanjia became disillusioned with communism and its anti-Hindu secularism. He became a strong sympathiser of the Bharatiya Janata Party and the Ayodhya movement. Kulkarni claims that thus P. Sainath as deputy editor was replaced with him by Karanjia.

Devotee of Satya Saibaba
Initially a fierce critic of the Indian guru Sathya Sai Baba Karanjia became his devotee in 1976.

Books
 1952: China stands up and wolves of the Wild West
 1956: SEATO: Security or Menace?
 1958: Arab Dawn
 1960: The Mind of Mr. Nehru
 1961: Castro: Storm Over Latin America
 1966: The Philosophy Of Mr. Nehru
 1970: Round Germany with Hitler
 1977: Kundalini Yoga
 1977: Mind of a Monarch: Biography of the Shah of Iran 
 1997: God Lives In India

References 

1912 births
2008 deaths
Indian newspaper editors
Indian male journalists
Parsi people from Mumbai
Followers of Sathya Sai Baba
People from Quetta
Nominated members of the Rajya Sabha
Indian investigative journalists
Journalists from Maharashtra
20th-century Indian journalists
Writers from Mumbai